Calcalist (a Hebrew wordplay on The Economist,  from כלכלה) is an Israeli daily business newspaper and website.

History and profile
Calcalist was first published on 18 February 2008, and currently runs five days a week, with a weekend supplement included on Thursdays. The paper is published in Israel by the Yedioth Ahronoth Group. The group also publishes Yedioth Ahronoth, the country's most widely circulated newspaper. The founder and publisher is Yoel Esteron, formerly the managing editor for Yedioth Ahronoth, and its editor is Galit Hemi. It is circulated nationwide and its articles feature regularly in the biggest Israeli news website 'Ynet' as well as in the printed edition of Yedioth Ahronoth.

The newspaper is divided into four sections: news, daily columns – some regular and some rotating (the rotating columns are marketing, legal, real estate, technology, career, personal finance, automotive and sports), the market – a separate addendum appearing Monday through Thursday, and "2016", the lifestyle section. Calcalist.co.il publishes most stories and articles from the newspaper, as well as news updates throughout the day and special digital features. According to SimilarWeb, which monitors websites, Calcalist.co.il has 8,300,000 unique users monthly, making it the most popular business website in the country.

In recent years Calcalist has also been recognized as the leader in national conferences, among them the prestigious "Israel forecasts"  and the innovative start-up competitions.

The newspaper's slogan is "Israel is connecting to economics". According to the newspaper's management, Calcalist targets professionals in the fields of economy, law and business, but at the same time tries to appeal to a larger audience.

In November 2017, Calcalist launched an English-language site focusing on Israeli technology news, called CTech.

See also

 Globes
 TheMarker
 List of Israeli newspapers

References

External links

  

2008 establishments in Israel
Yedioth Ahronoth
Daily newspapers published in Israel
Hebrew-language newspapers
Newspapers established in 2008